Gulshan Nanda (1929 – 16 November 1985) was an Indian novelist and screenwriter. Many of his novels were adapted into Hindi films in the 1960s and 1970s, including more than a dozen big hits of the period — Kaajal (1965), Kati Patang (1970), Khilona (1970), Sharmeelee (1971) and Daag (1973). He frequently collborated with Rajesh Khanna with films like Kati Patang, Daag, Ajanabee, Mehbooba and Nazrana. His stories encompassed a range of themes, from social issues and romance to action thrillers. He was nominated for the Filmfare Award for Best Story six times, for Kaajal (1965), Neel Kamal (1968), Khilona (1970), Kati Patang (1970), Naya Zamana (1971) and Mehbooba (1976). His sons Rahul (married to Rakita Chopra, daughter of actor Prem Chopra) and Himanshu Nanda are veteran publicity designers for Bollywood and conceived the concept of Akshay Kumar starrer, Patiala House (2011).

Filmography

References

External links
 
 Re-Evaluating Gulshan Nanda. Boloji.

1929 births
1985 deaths
Indian male screenwriters
Hindi-language writers
Indian male novelists
Recipients of the Padma Shri in other fields
20th-century Indian dramatists and playwrights
Hindi novelists
Hindi screenwriters
20th-century Indian male writers
20th-century Indian screenwriters